Arkansas Highway 158 (AR 158, Hwy. 158) is a designation for two state highways in northeast Arkansas. The main segment of  runs east from Highway 1 to US Route 61 (US 61) in Luxora. A short route of  runs from U.S. Route 49 across railroad tracks in rural Craighead County.

Route description

Greenfield to Luxora
AR 158 begins at AR 1 in Greenfield. The route runs east and begins to concur with AR 163 north. AR 158 then heads east, crossing US 63 and AR 463 near Bay. The route continues east then north to meet AR 18 in Bowman. AR 18/AR 135/AR 158 run together until Black Oak, with AR 135/AR 158 continuing together until Caraway.

The route continues east to meet AR 77 in Lennie. AR 158 runs east to cross Interstate 55 and US 61 before Luxora. The route terminates at US 61 in north Luxora.

Craighead County
The route begins at US 49 and runs briefly east across the Union Pacific Railroad tracks. The route then curves north parallel to US 49, with the roadway terminating at an agricultural facility.

History
The route was first designated AR 158 in 1936. The highways was a gravel/stone road from AR 77 east to Luxora. The route was extended west to the Caraway area in 1952, but remained entirely gravel. A segment of AR 158 was added from Bay to Lunsford around 1960. The short route was added to the state highway system in 1979.

Major intersections
Mile markers reset at concurrencies.

|colspan=6 align=center|  concurrency north, 

|colspan=4 align=center|  concurrency south, 

|colspan=5 align=center|  concurrency east, 

|colspan=5 align=center|  concurrency south, 

|colspan=6 align=center| AR 158 main segment ends, AR 158 rural segment begins at U.S. Route 49

See also

 List of state highways in Arkansas

References

External links

158
Transportation in Poinsett County, Arkansas
Transportation in Craighead County, Arkansas
Transportation in Mississippi County, Arkansas